Tomás Fernández Ruiz (born in Spain, 1915, date of death unknown) was a Cuban footballer.

International career
He was born in Spain and represented Cuba at the 1938 FIFA World Cup in France, scoring a goal against Romania

References

External links
 

1915 births
Year of death missing
Association football forwards
Cuban footballers
Cuba international footballers
1938 FIFA World Cup players
Spanish emigrants to Cuba
Footballers from Santander, Spain
Spanish footballers